A quintain or pentastich is any poetic form containing five lines.  Examples include the tanka, the cinquain, the quintilla, Shakespeare's Sonnet 99, and the limerick.

Examples

Sonnet 99 (first stanza) 

The forward violet thus did I chide:
Sweet thief, whence didst thou steal thy sweet that smells
If not from my love’s breath? The purple pride
Which on thy soft cheek for complexion dwells,
In my love’s veins thou hast too grossly dyed.
— William Shakespeare

Autumn Song 

Know'st thou not at the fall of the leaf 
How the heart feels a languid grief 
        Laid on it for a covering, 
        And how sleep seems a goodly thing 
In Autumn at the fall of the leaf?

And how the swift beat of the brain 
Falters because it is in vain, 
        In Autumn at the fall of the leaf 
        Knowest thou not? and how the chief 
Of joys seems—not to suffer pain?

Know'st thou not at the fall of the leaf 
How the soul feels like a dried sheaf 
        Bound up at length for harvesting, 
        And how death seems a comely thing 
In Autumn at the fall of the leaf?
— Dante Gabriel Rossetti

The Corporal (extract) 

Half of my youth I watched the soldiers
And saw mechanic clerk and cook 
Subsumed beneath a uniform.
Gray black and khaki was their look
Whose tool and instrument was death.

I watched them wheel on white parade grounds.
How could the flesh have such control?
Ballets with symmetry of the flower
Outlined the aspect of a soul
Whose pure precision was of death. 
— Thom Gunn

See also 
Mukhammas
Stanza

References

Further reading

External links 
The Poet's Garret webpage. List and description of five-line poetry forms

Stanzaic form
Poetic forms

fr:Quintil
ja:五行連